Hakhshara (also transliterated Hachshara or Hakhsharah) is a Hebrew word that literally means "preparation". The term is used for training programs and agricultural centres in Europe and elsewhere. At these centers Zionist youth and young adults would learn vocational skills necessary for their emigration to Israel and subsequent life in kibbutzim. Such camps existed before World War II, and still exist today. Nowadays, these programs are usually based on kibbutzim in Israel for youth who are in their gap year, between finishing high-school and starting university, and include exploring Israel and studying Israeli culture. This was also true of the religious programs, that until a few decades were based based on a religious kibbutz and typically contained a period of Torah study. Nowadays, the religious programs still incorporate a period on a religious kibbutz, but are more diverse in what they offer, see https://www.worldbneiakiva.org/gap-year-program-israel-hachshara .

List of Hakhshara centres

Pre-war Germany
Schniebinchen in Germany (now Świbinki, Poland).
Landwerk Neuendorf at Steinhöfel, Germany
Altona-Blankenese at Hamburg, Germany
Fraustadt in Posen-West Prussia, Germany, now Wschowa, Poland
Markenhof in Germany
Marx family at Gruessen (now Gemunden, Wohra), Germany

Italy
Sciesopoli in Italy.

Netherlands
Werkdorp Nieuwesluis in the Netherlands
Westerbork (village)

Pre-war Poland
Iwanie Puste and nearby village of Tzygany, now in Ternopil Oblast, Ukraine

Pre-war Lithuania
Ponevezh (Yiddish) or Panevėžys, Lithuania

Post-war Australia
Springvale, Victoria and later Toolamba, Australia

See also
 HeHalutz, organization
 Youth aliyah
 Youth village

References

Jewish educational organizations
 
Zionist organizations
Hebrew words and phrases
Zionist youth movements